West Point Mill is a reproduction of the historic gristmill on the Eno River in north Durham, North Carolina. The mill and other historic structures are preserved in the West Point on the Eno city park. The mill operates as part of a free tour on weekends, with mill-ground meal and flour available for purchase.

External links
West Point on the Eno - City of Durham Park - West Point Mill information

Grinding mills on the National Register of Historic Places in North Carolina
Mill museums in North Carolina
Museums in Durham, North Carolina
Grinding mills in North Carolina
National Register of Historic Places in Durham County, North Carolina